Abdun Noor Shajal (known as Shajal) is a Bangladeshi actor and model. Shajal began his career through modelling before he started acting on television. He appeared in several films. He has acted in several notable plays. Also among his notable works in the film are Jin, Haar Jeet, Run Out.

Early life and education
Shajal was a student of Dhaka College and studied Bachelors in Business Administration at Jahangirnagar University.

Career
Shajal is one of the most popular actors of this time who step in media as a host and a model. He made an appearance for TV commercial of "Starship Condensed Milk" directed by Afzal Hossain and also has been picked as a model for TVC of Cute Shampoo. Shajal Noor started his career as an anchor on a popular magazine show called "Virgin Takdum Takdum" in 2000.

In 2004, Shajal made his acting debut in a drama called "Tokhono Jante Baki,". He got recognition as an actor in the drama "Hiraful" directed by Afzal Hossain.

In 2016, the shooting of a film titled 'Sangjog' started with the mass funding of his film. Directed by Abu Sayyid, the film starred Syed Shamsul Haque, Inamul Haque, KS Firoz and four other television reporters at that time.  Sajal has been newly added to the film, with newcomer Saima Smriti as its heroine. Shajal is expected to enter the silver screen with an action romantic film called "Run Out" which is directed by Tonmoy Tansen. Recently, he is acting in a new film titled 'Suvarnabhoomi'. The producer is Zahid Hossain.

Filmography

Television

Awards 
CJFB Performance Award -  2011 - Best TV Actor

RTV Star Award

References

External links
 
 Shajal Noor at the Bangla Movie Database

Living people
People from Dhaka
Bangladeshi male film actors
Bengali male television actors
21st-century Bangladeshi male actors
Jahangirnagar University alumni
Dhaka College alumni
Place of birth missing (living people)
Date of birth missing (living people)
Year of birth missing (living people)